Gajakesariyogam is a 1990 Indian Malayalam-language film directed by P. G. Viswambharan and starring Innocent, K. P. A. C. Lalitha, and Mukesh. The film is about the struggles Nair faces after purchasing an elephant named Sreevidya from a North Indian circus company that only knows Hindi. This film was one of the many films in which Innocent and K.P.A.C Lalitha play an on-screen couple. The film became a box office success.

Cast 

Innocent as Ayyappan Nair
K. P. A. C. Lalitha as Madhavi
Mukesh as Vinayachandran aka Vinayan
Sunita as Karthika
Mamukkoya as Raghavan Nair
Jagadish as Parasuraman
K. B. Ganesh Kumar as Vasu
Paravoor Bharathan as Khader
Thesni Khan as Suhara
Baiju
Siddique
 Oduvil Unnikrishnan
 Philomina
Sukumaran
Kunchan
Balan K Nair as Nambiar
Sainuddin

Production 
K. P. A. C. Lalitha shot for this film in Shoranur along with another film by her husband Bharathan.

Themes and influences 
Innocent plays a Malayali man who learns Hindi in this film. Innocent went on to play a Hindi-speaking politician in Sandesham (1991). The film explores the bond between a man and an elephant, this bond is present in other films such as Aanachandam (2006). A scene in the film was based on an incident in the unreleased Malayalam film Chottanikkara Bhagawathi. The incident revolved around an art director who was scared of the elephant and started moving after the director called action although the elephant and the mahout did not move.

Soundtrack 
The song features a song "Aanachantham" with Innocent and the elephant. The film is one of the "cutest songs of Mollywood" according to the New Indian Express.

Reception 
In a review of the film in December 2021, Silpa Rajan of The Times of India opined that "The movie is absolutely engaging, entertaining, and heartwarming and also lays out the problems faced by naïve and gold-hearted people who step foot into the uncharted waters of business".

Legacy 
The scenes where Mukesh's character teaches Innocent's character Hindi became famous.

References

External links
 

Films directed by P. G. Viswambharan
Films about elephants
Films shot in Palakkad